The Oath Against Modernism was required of "all clergy, pastors, confessors, preachers, religious superiors, and professors in philosophical-theological seminaries" of the Catholic Church from 1910 until 1967. It was instituted on 1 September 1910 by Pope Pius X in his motu proprio Sacrorum antistitum and rescinded on 17 July 1967 by the Congregation for the Doctrine of the Faith with the approval of Paul VI.

The oath marked the culmination of Pius X's campaign against the theological movement of modernism, which he extensively analyzed and denounced as heretical in his 1907 encyclicals Pascendi Dominici gregis and Lamentabili sane exitu. Thomas Pègues, O.P. was also influential in the anti-modernist movement within the Church.

The Oath Against Modernism is still pronounced by some of the clergy who are members of traditionalist Catholic movements, such as the Society of Saint Pius X, the Congregation of Mary Immaculate Queen, and the Istituto Mater Boni Consilii.

See also
Ad tuendam fidem
Humani generis
Providentissimus Deus

References

External links
Oath from Pius X
The original Latin text of Sacrorum antistitum
The oath against modernism in English, excerpted from Sacrorum antistitum

Religious oaths
Modernism in the Catholic Church